Comecrudo is an extinct Pakawan language of Mexico. The name Comecrudo is Spanish for "eat-raw"; Carrizo is Spanish for "reed". It was best recorded in a list of 148 words in 1829 by French botanist Jean Louis Berlandier (Berlandier called it "Mulato") (Berlandier et al. 1828–1829). It was spoken on the lower Rio Grande near Reynosa, Tamaulipas, in Mexico. Comecrudo has often been considered a Coahuiltecan language although most linguists now consider the relationship between them unprovable due to the lack of information.

Comecrudo tribal names were recorded in 1748 (Saldivar 1943):
 Sepinpacam
 Perpepug
 Atanaguaypacam / Atanaouajapaca (also known as Atanaguipacane)

In 1861, German Adolph Uhde published a travelogue with some vocabulary (Uhde called the language Carrizo) (Uhde 1861: 185–186). In 1886, Albert Gatschet recorded vocabulary, sentences, and a short text from the descendants (who were not fluent) of the last Comecrudo speakers near Camargo, Tamaulipas, at Las Prietas (Swanton 1940: 55–118). The best of these consultants were Emiterio, Joaquin, and Andrade.

An automated computational analysis (ASJP 4) by Müller et al. (2013) found lexical similarities with Uto-Aztecan, likely due to borrowings.

See also
 Comecrudo people
 Coahuiltecan
 Coahuiltecan people

References

Further reading
 Berlandier, Jean L. (1969). The Indians of Texas in 1830. Ewers, John C. (Ed.). Washington: Smithsonian Institution.
 Berlandier, Jean L.; & Chowell, Rafael (1828–1829). [Vocabularies of languages of south Texas and the lower Rio Grande]. (Additional manuscripts, no. 38720, in the British Library, London.)
 Berlandier, Jean L.; & Chowell, Rafael (1850). Luis Berlandier and Rafael Chovell. Diario de viaje de la Comisión de Límites. Mexico.
 Gatschet, Albert S. (1886). [Field notes on Comecrudo and Cotoname, collected at Las Prietas, Tamaulipas]. Smithsonian Institution, National Anthropological Archives Ms. no. 297.
 Swanton, John. (1940). Linguistics material from the tribes of southern Texas and northern Mexico. Bureau of American Ethnology, Bulletin, 127 (pp. 1–145).
 Uhde, Adolph. (1861). Die Länder am untern Rio Bravo del Norte''. Heidelberg: J. C. B. Mohr.

Pakawan languages
Comecrudan languages
Extinct languages of North America